Lathrotriccus is a  small genus of  passerine birds in the tyrant flycatcher family. They breed in tropical South America, including, for one species, the islands of Trinidad and formerly also Grenada.

They closely resembles the Empidonax flycatchers in appearance, and were formerly placed in that genus, but differ anatomically and biochemically.

There are only two species in the genus:

These are birds of fairly open habitats such as open woods and arid scrub. They are inconspicuous birds, tending to keep to undergrowth perches from which they sally forth to catch insects.

References 

 
Bird genera